Myodocarpus angustialatus is the provisional name for a threatened species of plant in the family Myodocarpaceae, which has not yet been formally described scientifically. It is endemic to New Caledonia.

References

Endemic flora of New Caledonia
angustialatus
Vulnerable plants
Undescribed plant species
Taxonomy articles created by Polbot